My Sky, My Home is a 1990 Indonesian drama film directed by Slamet Rahardjo. It was Indonesia's submission to the 63rd Academy Awards for the Academy Award for Best Foreign Language Film, but was not accepted as a nominee.

See also
 Cinema of Indonesia
 List of submissions to the 63rd Academy Awards for Best Foreign Language Film
 List of Indonesian submissions for the Academy Award for Best Foreign Language Film

References

External links
 

1990 films
1990 drama films
Films shot in Indonesia
Films directed by Slamet Rahardjo
Indonesian drama films